Ȼ (minuscule: ȼ) is a letter of the Latin alphabet, formed from C with the addition of a stroke through the letter.

Use on computers
Ȼ was added to Unicode 4.1 in 2005, in the Latin Extended-B block. It did previously not exist in character sets, and consequently, few fonts can display it. The cent sign is often substituted for it instead.

See also
¢ the symbol for cent
₵, the symbol for the Ghanaian cedi
₡, the symbol for the Salvadoran and Costa Rican colón

References 

Latin-script letters
Phonetic transcription symbols